Wabash Avenue–West Historic District is a national historic district located at Terre Haute, Vigo County, Indiana. It encompasses 24 contributing buildings in the central business district of Terre Haute.  It developed after 1870 and includes representative examples of Italianate, Romanesque Revival, and Renaissance Revival style architecture.  Notable buildings include 408 Wabash Avenue (c. 1870), 425-431 Wabash Avenue (1867-1868), the White Block (1899), The Albrecht Building (1893), 522 Wabash Avenue (1890), 524 Wabash Avenue (c. 1890), Koopman Building (1875), Blumberg Building (1915), and the Hotel Deming (1914).

It was listed on the National Register of Historic Places in 1983.

References

Historic districts on the National Register of Historic Places in Indiana
Italianate architecture in Indiana
Romanesque Revival architecture in Indiana
Renaissance Revival architecture in Indiana
Historic districts in Terre Haute, Indiana
National Register of Historic Places in Terre Haute, Indiana